Kiriwini Rural LLG is a local-level government (LLG) of Milne Bay Province, Papua New Guinea.

Wards
01. Kaibola
02. Mwatawa
03. Tubowada
04. Dayagila
05. Liluta
06. Kwebwaga
07. Omarakana
08. Kabwaku
09. Okaikoda
10. Yalumgwa
11. Kuruvitu
12. Yalaka
13. Wabutuma
14. Bwetalu
15. Gumilababa
16. Kapwapu
17. Kavataria
18. Mulosaida
19. Oyuveyova
20. Tukwaukwa
21. Okaiboma
22. Ilalima
23. Obulaku
24. Sinaketa
25. Loya
26. Vakuta
27. Kwumwagea
28. Lalela
29. Okabulula
30. Kaduwaga
31. Koma
32. Kuyawa
33. Simsimla

References

Local-level governments of Milne Bay Province